Varaldsøy is an island (and village) in the municipality of Kvinnherad in Vestland county, Norway. The  island is the largest island in the Hardangerfjorden. Most of the inhabitants live on the southern tip of the island in the village of Varaldsøy, where Varaldsøy Church is located.

History
The island was historically a part of Strandebarm municipality until 1902 when it was transferred to the new Varaldsøy Municipality.  The island made up the majority of the municipality (plus some of the mainland to the west and north).  In 1965, the municipality of Varaldsøy was dissolved in a period of municipal consolidations in Norway.  The island was then transferred to the municipality of Kvinnherad.

See also
List of islands of Norway

References

Islands of Vestland
Villages in Vestland
Kvinnherad